Michał Filek (25 August 1916 – 6 August 2003) was a Polish footballer. He played in one match for the Poland national football team in 1947.

References

External links
 

1916 births
2003 deaths
Polish footballers
Poland international footballers
Place of birth missing
Association football forwards
Wisła Kraków players